The 1914 Tour de France was the 12th edition of Tour de France, one of cycling's Grand Tours. The Tour began in Paris on 28 June and Stage 9 occurred on 14 July with a mountainous stage from Marseille. The race finished in Paris on 26 July.

Stage 9
14 July 1914 — Marseille to Nice,

Stage 10
16 July 1914 — Nice to Grenoble,

Stage 11
18 July 1914 — Grenoble to Geneva,

Stage 12
20 July 1914 — Geneva to Belfort,

Stage 13
22 July 1914 — Belfort to Longwy,

Stage 14
24 July 1914 — Longwy to Dunkerque,

Stage 15
26 July 1914 — Dunkerque to Paris,

References

1914 Tour de France
Tour de France stages